In January 1963 Commonwealth Railways placed an order with Commonwealth Engineering, Granville for 24 air-conditioned carbon steel carriages.

These standard gauge carriages were purchased for use on the Trans Australian between Port Pirie Junction and Kalgoorlie, as well as on The Ghan from Port Pirie Junction to Marree.

At , they were the longest carriages in Australia. They were Commonwealth Railways' first Australian built standard gauge carriages, their predecessors having been manufactured in Europe or Japan.

In July 1975, all were included in the transfer of Commonwealth Railways to Australian National. Some were converted to crew carriages for use on Trans-Australian Railway freight trains while others were sold to the Australian Rail Track Corporation.

Fleet details

Individual carriage details

References

Commonwealth Railways
Railway coaches of Australia